Cebagoo Football Club or Cebagoo is a Malaysian football club, based in Sepanggar, Kota Kinabalu, Sabah that formerly played in the Malaysia FAM League. After 2014 Malaysia FAM League season concluded, the club pulled from the league and focused on development of youth and grassroots program in Sabah.

History
The Cebagoo Football Club formed by fishermen off the coast of Sabah in 1991. The club founded on the name of Kampung Kebagu, Sepanggar. It was known as Cebagoo Star before rebranding it to Cebagoo Football Club.

In 2011–12 season, the club won the 2011/2012 Liga Carino-SAFA Bandaraya Kota Kinabalu after defeating Beverly FC 2–1 in the final held at the UMS Stadium.

In October 2012, Cebagoo has officially unveiled their plans to take part in the Malaysia FAM League. They eventually become the fifth football club to have represented Sabah in the competition after Taya, Likas United, Internacionale FC, Gunosukod Pangaits and Beverly FC.

Malaysia former international Razali Zinin joined them as the head coach for their campaign in the FAM League. On 17 February 2013, Cebagoo made their debut in the Malaysia FAM League on a winning note after defeating Melaka 2–0 at the UMS Stadium.

They concluded their season with a 0–0 draw against Tumpat on 1 July 2013. The feat saw them end their challenge with merely four wins, including one on a technicality, six draws and 10 defeats.

The club has pulled from Malaysia FAM League after 2014 season concluded and focus on youth and grassroots football development.

Honours
 Liga Carino-SAFA Bandaraya Kota Kinabalu
Winners (1): 2011–12

Club captains

Head coach

Team managers

Management team

Club personnel
2014 Cebagoo Football Club
 Team manager: Mohammad Ishak Datuk Ayub
 Assistant manager: Asri Abdul Mali
 Head coach: Mohd Ayman Abdullah
 Assistant coach:
 Fitness coach: Hassan Madisah
 Physiotherapist: Eszico Joseph
 Security: Jais Damin
 Kitman: Jamal Damin
 Team secretary: Rosmat Apiu
 Assistant secretary: Mohidin Zainal
 Media officer: Mino Erysah Arshad

References

External links
 

Football clubs in Malaysia
1991 establishments in Malaysia